Skyscrapers are frequently featured in films for their impressive appearance and potent symbolism. They convey an impression of power – an old movie and TV cliché starts with the outside view of a skyscraper with a voice-over conversation, continuing inside the luxurious office of a tycoon or crime boss.

Skyscrapers' tight security and isolation from the rest of the city makes them ideal for dramatic crisis and trap situations including hostage-taking, heists and fire. Skyscrapers and other large landmarks also feature prominently in disaster films, where they are destroyed as a show of the power of nature or invaders.

Real skyscrapers
This is a list of actual skyscrapers that have a noticeable role as themselves in films, sorted by chronological building order. (See also: list of skyscrapers.)

Empire State Building (New York City 1931) 

 Famously climbed by the giant ape King Kong in the eponymous movie (1933) and in its remake (2005). 
 Destroyed by an alien ship in Independence Day (1996). 
 The Empire State Building is also seen in James and the Giant Peach. 
 The Empire State Building's observation deck features prominently in Sleepless in Seattle. 
 Stars in Andy Warhol's Empire, where it is seen in a continuous eight-hour-five-minute shot of the building at night.

Etihad Towers (Abu Dhabi 2011) 

 Portrayed in Furious 7, many action scenes are filmed here.

World Trade Center (New York City 1973) 

 Used prominently in the 1973 film version of Godspell during the song "All For the Best." 
 Climbed by King Kong in the 1976 remake of King Kong. 
 Exploded and collapsed after being hit by a fragment of the Meteor (1979). 
 Used as a makeshift runway by Snake Plissken in Escape from New York (1981).
 The New York Mercantile Exchange trading floor in 4 World Trade Center was the scene of the climax of Trading Places (1983).
 Features in the opening and closing sequences of Oliver & Company (1988). 
 The roof of the World Trade Center is featured in Crocodile Dundee (1986) during a photoshoot Sue Charlton is doing during Mick Dundee's New York visit.
 In the film Home Alone 2: Lost in New York (1992) Kevin McCallister stops at the building while sightseeing. 
 Seen in various scenes of Die Hard with a Vengeance (1995). 
 Severely damaged by meteor shower in Armageddon (1998) and severely damaged by an ocean wave (from comet impact) in Deep Impact. 
 Leaped onto from a failing helicopter in Read or Die (May 2001). 
 The roof of the World Trade Center was also the original scene of the final climax in the film Men in Black II (2002), but after the September 11, 2001 attacks, the producers chose to reshoot the scene with an "ordinary" roof in New York City. 
 In Steven Spielberg's Munich (2005), there is a scene in the last minutes of the film where two men are walking with the New York City skyline in the background. Because the scene takes place before the World Trade Center fell, a digital version of the World Trade Center was added to the New York skyline. 
 In the 2006 film World Trade Center, the World Trade Center is seen, but is animated (or created with pictures from the time before 9/11). 
 The building was the setting of 2008's Academy Award-winning documentary, Man on Wire, about tightrope walker Philippe Petit's daring 1974 walk between the towers as well as in Robert Zemeckis' 2015 American 3D biographical drama film The Walk. 
 At the end of Gangs of New York (2002), the towers are visible in the background of the scene showing time passing from the 19th century to the present. 
 The towers play a significant role in the 2010 film Remember Me.

Chrysler Building (New York City 1930) 

Lair of the winged serpent Quetzalcoatl in Q (1982). 
Prominently featured in The Caveman's Valentine. 
Accidentally destroyed by U.S. military forces in Godzilla (1998). 
Destroyed by a meteorite in Armageddon (1998). 
Flown through by the Silver Surfer in Fantastic Four: Rise of the Silver Surfer (2007).

MetLife Building (New York City 1963) 

Featured in its original guise as the Pan Am Building in the opening scenes of Only When I Larf (1968), and the helipad is also used in the characters' escape. 
Destroyed first by Godzilla when it walked through the building leaving a massive gap in it in the film Godzilla (1998). 
It was later destroyed in Knowing (2009) when a solar flare annihilates the Earth.

Capitol Records Building (Los Angeles 1956) 

A distinctive Hollywood landmark, frequently destroyed in blockbuster films including Earthquake, Independence Day, and The Day After Tomorrow. 
In the film Hancock, the title character pierces the building's pinnacle with a car in the opening scene.

Sunset Vine Tower (Los Angeles 1966) 

Damaged by fire in 2001, the tower was later remodeled and converted into condominiums. 
The Sunset Vine Tower was prominently featured in 1974's Earthquake, earning it the affectionate moniker of "The Earthquake Tower". However, in the movie, it's depicted as being 30 stories tall, when it reality, it only has 20 floors.

Tour Montparnasse (Paris 1973) 

Taken over by terrorists in the French Die Hard parody La Tour Montparnasse Infernale (2001). The title is a spoof on The Towering Inferno (see "Glass Tower" in next section).

Two International Finance Centre (Hong Kong 2003) 

Featured in Lara Croft Tomb Raider: The Cradle of Life (2003), The Dark Knight (2008), New Police Story (2004) and Rush Hour 2 (2001).

Petronas Twin Towers (Kuala Lumpur 1998) 

Setting of a spectacular heist in the film Entrapment (1999). 
Used as a major setting in a Bollywood movie Don. 
In Independence Day Resurgence, the towers are seen falling onto the London Tower Bridge by aliens, with a character commenting: "They like to get the landmarks".

John Hancock Center (Chicago 1988) 

Principal setting of the paranormal events of the film Poltergeist III (1988). In the film, the manager is Bruce Gardner (Tom Skerritt), Carol Anne's (Heather O'Rourke) uncle. The reverend Henry Kane (Nathan Davis) follows her to the skyscraper, where all his reign of terror starts again and terrorizes Carol Anne.

Taipei 101 (Taipei 2004) 

While not yet featured in a major international film as of 2004, in local productions it is fast becoming an Eiffel Tower-like cliché that the view from every Taipei apartment includes Taipei 101.

Terminal Tower (Cleveland 1930) 

Featured in Major League, The Fortune Cookie (1966), Proximity, The Deer Hunter (1978), A Christmas Story (1983), and Antwone Fisher (2002).

BP Tower (Cleveland 1985) 

In the 2004 movie The Oh in Ohio, Parker Posey's character has her office in the BP Tower. The Key Tower, Terminal Tower and Cleveland Browns Stadium can also seen in the film.

U.S. Bank Tower (Los Angeles 1990) 

The first building destroyed by the alien ships in the film Independence Day (1996). 
In The Day After Tomorrow by a tornado (2004). 
In 2012 (2009) the city including the U.S. Bank Tower gets destroyed due to Magnitude 10+ earthquakes.

Rialto Tower (Melbourne 1986) 

Featured in Ghost Rider (2007). The Ghost Rider is seen riding vertically up the tower to elude the authorities.

Sydney Tower (Sydney 1981) 

Destroyed by the monster Zilla in the Japanese film Godzilla: Final Wars. 
Also destroyed by meteors in the Hallmark film Supernova, which was released in 2005. 
Featured as the Angel Grove Observatory in 1995's Mighty Morphin Power Rangers: The Movie.

Burj Khalifa (Dubai 2010) 

Location of a part of the movie Mission: Impossible – Ghost Protocol. In the movie, Tom Cruise's character, Ethan Hunt, climbs 11 stories up on the outside in order to access the building's server. 
In Independence Day: Resurgence, the Burj Khalifa was seen where it - along with many other structures - is being thrown into London by the aliens using their mother ship's anti-gravity pull.

Woolworth Building (New York City 1913) 

The Woolworth Building was one of the buildings near the mysterious explosion and the first structure to be destroyed by the creature in the 2008 film Cloverfield. The main characters were among the dozens of people present when it collapsed.
It also appears near the latter part of the 2007 Disney movie Enchanted where the main protagonists attending a costume ball at the building's summit meet the wicked queen of Andalasia and figure in a duel leading them outside to the roof of the building. The Neo-Gothic details of the Woolworth Building's spire (designed by Architect Cass Gilbert) are discernible despite the night-time duel scene between the dragon-morphed evil queen and the protagonists. 
In Baz Luhrmann's film adaptation of The Great Gatsby (2013), Nick Carraway works in the building as a stock broker for Chase. In an opening scene, a spectacular tilt down from the top of the building is shown.

Willis Tower (Chicago 1973) 

Appears in  Ferris Bueller's Day Off (1986), I, Robot (2004) (in the year 2035 with new triangular antennas), The Dark Knight (2008), Transformers: Dark of the Moon (2011), Man of Steel (2013), Divergent (2014), Jupiter Ascending (2015), and Rampage (2018).

One Canada Square (London 1991) 

Appears in G:MT - Greenwich Mean Time (1999) where it is referenced by its popular name, Canary Wharf. 
It frequently appears in 28 Weeks Later (2007) where the tower and the Docklands area around it are one of the main settings for the post-apocalyptic horror-thriller. 
From the same year, it also featured in Harry Potter and the Order of the Phoenix, where Harry and some members of the Order of the Phoenix pass next to One Canada Square as they head to Grimmauld Place near the beginning of the movie on their broomsticks. 
In Mission: Impossible Ghost Protocol (2011) featuring One Canada Square as the building where the IMF is located. Various shots of One Canada Square was featured including shots of Ethan Hunt climbing on the outside of the building.

Fictional skyscrapers
This is a list of named fictional skyscrapers that have a noticeable role in films (including notable science-fiction and fantasy), sorted by chronological filming order. In some cases, an actual building stands for the fictional one; in others, they are created using elaborate miniature models.

New Tower of Babel (Metropolis) 

Chief among the gothic skyscrapers of Fritz Lang's Metropolis (1927). The cityscape of Metropolis was inspired from Lang's trip to Manhattan and was, in turn, an inspiration for several dystopian science-fiction films including Blade Runner and Dark City.

Seacoast National Bank Building (New York City) 

This 100-story, Empire State Building-inspired tower is the center of a power struggle in Skyscraper Souls (1932), as ruthless banker David Dwight attempts to gain full control of the skyscraper.

Wynand Building (New York City) 

The creation of the uncompromising, objectivist architect Howard Roark, it features in the film adaptation of Ayn Rand's The Fountainhead (1949). The world's tallest, it is the culmination of Roark's ambition, "the will of man made visible."

Glass Tower (and Peerless Building) (San Francisco) 

This 138-story office/residential tower, the new "tallest building in the world", is the setting of The Towering Inferno (1974).
In the film, the guests in the building's Penthouse opening ceremony are trapped by a fire that breaks out due to faulty wiring. 
The "Peerless Building" is a structure depicted in the film as being the tower's closest, tallest neighbor. 
The idea of the "world's tallest" was featured in both novels on which the film was based, and was inspired, ironically, by New York's World Trade Center which was completed the year before the movie's release. 
Filmed prior to the widespread use of Digital CGI, the Glass Tower was actually a series of half inch and inch scale models.
The miniatures cost $1,110,000 and the tallest of these was 70 feet high and was guyed off in all four directions and filmed against a blue screen on the concrete floor of Sersen Lake at the Twentieth Century Fox Ranch in Malibu, California.
Similarly, five floors of the building were built in full scale at the same facility for close up shooting of action scenes. The building's name was a combination of "The Glass House" from The Glass Inferno and "The World Tower" from The Tower.

Tyrell Corporation Headquarters (Los Angeles) 

The immense truncated pyramid-shaped structure, flanked by inwardly-slanted towers, dominates the cityscape of Ridley Scott's Blade Runner (1982). 
The futuristic city has been described as a place where the height of the World Trade Center had become the norm, filled with buildings hundreds of stories tall, with Tyrell's pyramid being six or seven times the height of the WTC and at least a hundred times more massive . 
Main protagonist Deckard himself lives on the 97th floor of a generic building.

Nakatomi Plaza (Los Angeles) 

A 31-floor building taken over by terrorists in the classic action film Die Hard (1988). 
The building is actually the 34-story Fox Plaza, 20th Century Fox's Los Angeles headquarters. 
Most of the interior shots (excluding the lobby and roof) were shot on the Fox lot, located nearby.
The Japanese name of this and other fictional buildings (such as Nakamoto Tower in 1993's Rising Sun) provides an interesting window on the 1980s mindset that Japanese corporations would take over the world's economy and real estate, especially after the real-life acquisition of Rockefeller Center by a Mitsubishi subsidiary (completed in 1989). 
In fact, there have been relatively few such takeovers, and few if any U.S. skyscrapers were ever actually named after Japanese corporations.

Art Land's Galaxy Hotel (Las Vegas) 

A fictional futuristic hotel/casino in Las Vegas, Nevada from the 1996 film Mars Attacks! 
The hotel was destroyed by a UFO during a martian invasion. 
In reality the building was the Landmark Hotel and Casino which was imploded in 1995.

Galactic Senate Building 500 Republica (Coruscant) 

One of the innumerable towers covering the fictional city-planet of Coruscant from the Star Wars universe, first seen on film in the Special Edition of Return of the Jedi (1997), then in the Star Wars prequels. 
On Coruscant, buildings are used as the foundations for new buildings that actually pierce the cloud layer. 
The fifty lower levels form a dangerous underworld where ordinary citizens never go. 
The city-planet was inspired by Trantor in Isaac Asimov's Foundation saga.

Scolex Industries 

The corporate headquarters of the main villain Sanford Scolex (Doctor Claw) in the 1999 film Inspector Gadget. In reality, the building is the PPG Place in Pittsburgh, Pennsylvania.

MNU Building (Johannesburg) 

A building used in the 2009 film District 9.

Fiddler's Green 

In Land of the Dead, is by far the most notable landmark in the "City of the Living" and serves as a metaphor for the disconnection between wealthy and poor classes in society.

Clamp Centre 

The setting of Gremlins 2: The New Batch. Exterior shots of the building are actually 101 Park Avenue in New York City.

The Zitex Building 

The titular tower of the 1996 film Skyscraper.

Stark Tower 

In The Avengers. Prior to the events of the film, Tony Stark purchased the Metlife Building and deconstructed the upper two-thirds of the skyscraper. 
By the events of the film, construction of a new structure (built on top of the bottom third of the building) is nearly complete.
During the Battle of New York, the building sustains minor damage. 
The skyscraper is subsequently repurposed as Avengers Tower, and appears in Captain America: The Winter Soldier, Avengers: Age of Ultron, and Doctor Strange.

OCP Tower 

In RoboCop. The building was portrayed by the Dallas City Hall with the building's upper floors added in via special effects as the actual city hall building is only 7 stories tall.

Tower Sky 

A fictional 448m, 108-story high twin tower complex in Seoul, South Korea, in the 2012 disaster film The Tower. 
As stated in the film, Tower A was called Riverview, and Tower B was called Cityview. 
With over 5700 residents, it was South Korea's biggest residential complex. 
In the film, the owner of the complex decided to hold a Christmas party and had 10 helicopters circling above the building, despite the warnings of the owner's employees. 
On Christmas Eve, one of the helicopters crashed into Tower A. The crash also damaged the structure of the bridge connecting the twin tower, making the characters unable to escape to Tower B.

The Pearl (Hong Kong) 

A 3,500 feet tall skyscraper from the 2018 movie Skyscraper.

Beika City Building 

From the 1997 Japanese animated movie Detective Conan: The Time Bombed Skyscraper or Case Closed: The Time Bombed Skyscraper.

External links
Top 10 Skyscraper Movies from architecture.about.com

Film
Lists of films by common content